Isaiah 45 is the forty-fifth chapter of the Book of Isaiah in the Hebrew Bible or the Old Testament of the Christian Bible. This book contains the prophecies attributed to the prophet Isaiah, and is one of the Books of the Prophets.

Text
The original text was written in Hebrew language. This chapter is divided into 25 verses.

Textual witnesses
Some early manuscripts containing the text of this chapter in Hebrew are of the Masoretic Text tradition, which includes the Codex Cairensis (895), the Petersburg Codex of the Prophets (916), Aleppo Codex (10th century), Codex Leningradensis (1008).

Fragments containing parts of this chapter were found among the Dead Sea Scrolls (3rd century BC or later):
 1QIsaa: complete
 1QIsab: extant: verses 1‑13
 4QIsab (4Q56): extant: verses 20‑25
 4QIsac (4Q57): extant: verses 1‑4, 6‑13

There is also a translation into Koine Greek known as the Septuagint, made in the last few centuries BCE. Extant ancient manuscripts of the Septuagint version include Codex Vaticanus (B; B; 4th century), Codex Sinaiticus (S; BHK: S; 4th century), Codex Alexandrinus (A; A; 5th century) and Codex Marchalianus (Q; Q; 6th century).

Parashot
The parashah sections listed here are based on the Aleppo Codex. Isaiah 45 is a part of the Consolations (Isaiah 40–66). {P}: open parashah; {S}: closed parashah.
 {P} 45:1-7 {P} 45:8 {S} 45:9 {S} 45:10 {S} 45:11-13 {S} 45:14-17 {P} 45:18-25 [46:1-2 {P}]

Verse 1

The Septuagint refers to Cyrus the Great as "my anointed".

Verse 13

Verse 14

The Egyptian, Ethiopian and Sabaean peoples "are apparently represented here as already conquered by Cyrus". The text may be interpreted as foretelling "spontaneous homage rendered to Israel by distant nations of the earth", or in terms of a prospective conquest; for Skinner in the Cambridge Bible for Schools and Colleges "the whole scene strongly suggests a submission that has been preceded by humiliation and defeat. The meaning probably is that the treasures of the nations are made over to Israel by Cyrus".

Verse 25

Uses

Music
"Isaiah 45:23" is a song title in the album "The Life of the World to Come" inspired by this verse that was released by the American band The Mountain Goats in 2009.

See also
Related Bible parts:  Isaiah 44

References

Bibliography

External links

Jewish
Isaiah 45 Original Hebrew with Parallel English

Christian
Isaiah 45 English Translation with Parallel Latin Vulgate

45